The Porto Ferreira State Park  is a state park in the state of São Paulo, Brazil.

Location

The Porto Ferreira State Park is in the municipality of Porto Ferreira,  from the city of São Paulo.

History

The Porto Ferreira State Reserve as created by decree 40.991 of 6 November 1962.
It became the Porto Ferreira State Park  by decree 26.891 of 12 March 1987.

Environment

The cerrado holds 200 species of trees including pau-terra, barbartimão, cinzeiro, capitão-do-campo and pimenta-de-macaco.
The seasonal semi-deciduous forest includes large species, such as the jequitibá-rosa, figueira, cedro and the peroba.

The forest provides a refuge for species such as the maned wolf (Chrysocyon brachyurus), southern tamandua (Tamandua tetradactyla), lowland paca (Cuniculus paca), titi monkeys, and birds such as undulated tinamou (Crypturellus undulatus) and the turquoise-fronted amazon (Amazona aestiva).

Notes

Sources

State parks of Brazil
Protected areas established in 1987
1987 establishments in Brazil
Protected areas of São Paulo (state)